The L and M class was a class of sixteen destroyers which served in the British Royal Navy during World War II. The ships of the class were launched between 1939 and 1942.

The L class (also known as the Laforeys) were approved under the 1937 Naval Estimates. Four of these ships (Lance, Lively, Legion and Larne) were built with  armament instead of 4.7 inch. Six of the eight were war losses, with the surviving pair being broken up in 1948.

The M Class were built under the 1939 Naval Estimates.  They served in the Home Fleet until 1944 and then went to the Mediterranean. Three were wartime losses; of the five survivors, the Musketeer was broken up in 1955 and the other four sold to Turkey in 1958.

Design details
The armament of the class was subject of considerable debate, as the proponents of heavier anti-aircraft armaments for such vessels were at last beginning to be listened to by the Admiralty. This came mainly as a result of the lessons learned during the Spanish Civil War – i.e., military aircraft were now sufficiently advanced to pose a major threat to land and sea targets.

The ships of the L and M class had single funnels, like the previous J class, a tripod foremast and a short mainmast just aft of amidships. One feature of note was the bridge design. The increased height of the new gunhouses of the L class meant that the wheelhouse was raised further, and the sloped roof of the wheelhouse (to direct the airflow over the compass platform) was almost flat. This feature was unique to the L and Ms.

As ordered, the class comprised a leader and 7 destroyers. Each ship was to mount six  guns and 8 torpedo tubes. Close range armament had still to be decided, with the expected time of delivery being a crucial factor.

They were the first British destroyers to have their guns in fully enclosed mountings. They also continued the practice (first introduced in the Js) of making the leader  almost indistinguishable from the rest of the class, having only more extensive cabin accommodation and better radio (W/T – "wireless telegraph") equipment

Main armament 
As ordered, the ships were to have six QF Mark XI  guns in Mark XX twin mountings in 'A', 'B', and 'X' positions. The 'X' mount gave an estimated arc of fire of 320 degrees at low elevations and 360 degrees at elevations above around 20 degrees. The Mark XI gun itself was a major improvement on the previous version in that it threw a  shell (compared to the 50 lb (23 kg) shell in the preceding J class). The Mark XX mount was fully enclosed and supposedly weatherproof; in service, crews found otherwise. It also allowed the guns to be elevated independently. The Mark XX was not technically a turret, as the ammunition feed system was distinct from the weapon mounting, and did not train with the revolving mass. This meant that ammunition supply when the guns were at the limit of training was somewhat difficult. This also meant that the ammunition hoists had to be located between the guns just as in the USN 5" guns. As a result, the axes of the guns were very widely spaced, a feature instantly obvious with the Mark XX mounting.

The Mark XX mounting permitted an increased elevation to 50 degrees (compared to 40 for previous marks). However, this still limited the engagement time against enemy aircraft, although medium calibre guns posed little threat to dive bombers prior to the use of radar proximity fuzed ammunition. The Imperial Japanese Navy had already introduced a 5-inch (127 mm) gun with 70-degree elevation into service which had very poor performance  as an anti-aircraft weapon, while the United States Navy's 5"/38 cal Mark 32 mount could elevate to 85 degrees. The 4.5-inch (114 mm) guns fitted to Ark Royal were already in service and capable of elevations of 80 degrees, although the mountings were not suitable for a destroyer-size ship. Coupled with the lack of powered elevation, the Mark XX mounting was compromised in its chosen anti-aircraft role, although it compared favourably with any similar weapon in the Axis inventory.

Another development regarding the main armament was the adoption of a combined high-angle/low-angle director tower, the HA/LA Mk.IV (TP). This was never entirely satisfactory in the HA mode, and was at least a ton overweight. It was later reworked, somewhat unsuccessfully again, as the Mk.I "K tower" of the Z class. These ships used the Fuze Keeping Clock HA Fire Control Computer. Despite its problems, the L and M class' director tower and its Type 285 radar provided better high-angle fire control than any similar Axis destroyer, the vast majority of which did not have any high-angle fire control system, much less a dedicated AA fire control radar.

As originally ordered, the class had no close-range armament at all, as the various departments could not agree on what to fit. Arguments raged as to the effectiveness of mounting one or two four-barrelled 2 pdr "pom poms", one pom-pom and one of the  multiple machine guns then in development, one pom-pom and the traditional 0.5-inch (12.7 mm) Vickers machine gun. The argument was stoked by the manufacturing schedules (a second pom-pom per ship would not be available until 1942), the poor performance of the development models of the 0.661 and a number of younger officers (led by Lord Louis Mountbatten) dissatisfied with available anti-aircraft weaponry. Eventually, development of the 0.661 was dropped as it clearly would not be available and effective in a sensible timescale, this simplified the arguments somewhat.

The outbreak of war focused minds. Apart from the AA armament issue concerns started to be raised about progress generally. Associated changes were provision of two quadruple 0.5-inch (12.7 mm) machine guns. All ships of this class except Lightning and Laforey carried a four-barrel 2 pdr pom-pom.

The lessons of the Norwegian campaign and at Dunkirk drove home the need for this change and it was agreed in July 1940 that there were also to be four of the twin mounts instead of the originally proposed three. The fourth was to be at the forward end of the after superstructure which cut down on the fire arcs of both mounts but ensured the fourth would still be available for use in heavy weather.

Not all senior officers were in favour and some openly expressed opinions that it would mean the ships could not successfully fight their foreign equivalents. Experience in the Mediterranean, especially that of Force K which contained two of the 4-inch (102 mm) 'L's, showed that the loss of gun power against surface targets was balanced against a higher rate of fire.

Review of AA armament continued and in October a decision was taken to remove the after bank of torpedo tubes and fit a single 4-inch (102 mm) HA gun instead and that is how the  gunned ships eventually went to sea, although some surviving ships, including Matchless and Marne, had the after tubes replaced later in the war.

Proposed conversion
In the early 1950s, it was proposed to convert the five remaining ships of the M class, together with seven War Emergency Programme destroyers to Type 62 Air Direction Frigates. The conversion would have involved replacement of the ships' armament and sensors. The initial proposal would have armed the ships with a twin 4-inch gun mount, a twin 40 mm Bofors gun and a Squid anti-submarine mortar. Type 982 and 983 air direction radars would be fitted, as would Type 162 and 166 sonars. In March 1952, the programme was reduced, as the War Emergency Destroyers were too small to accommodate the heavy radars. Later that year, it was decided to substitute a US twin 3"/50 caliber gun mount for the 4-inch guns. The project was finally abandoned in May 1954, partly owing to the condition of the ships and poor shock-resistance.

Ships

L class
The L class (also known as the Laforeys) were approved under the 1937 Naval Estimates. Four of these ships (Lance, Lively, Legion and Larne) were built with  armament. Six of the eight were war losses, with the surviving pair being broken up in 1948.

M class

The M Class were built under the 1939 Naval Estimates.  They served in the Home Fleet until 1944 and then went to the Mediterranean. Three were wartime losses; of the five survivors, the Musketeer was broken up in 1955 and the other four sold to Turkey in 1958.

References

Citations

Bibliography

External links

 
Destroyer classes